Kim Clijsters was the defending champion, but did not compete this year.

Unseeded Alona Bondarenko won the title by defeating Francesca Schiavone 6–3, 6–2 in the final.

Seeds
The top four seeds received a bye into the second round.

Draw

Finals

Top half

Bottom half

References
 Main and Qualifying draws (WTA)

2006 Singles
Fortis Championships Luxembourg - Singles
2006 in Luxembourgian tennis